The Indonesian Food and Drug Authority  or Badan POM/BPOM or Indonesian FDA, is a government agency of Indonesia responsible for protecting  public health through the control and supervision of prescription and over-the-counter pharmaceutical drugs (medication), vaccines, biopharmaceuticals, dietary supplements, food safety, traditional medicine and cosmetics. The task and purposes of this agency is similar to the USFDA.

History 

The predecessor of BPOM was formed during the colonial period and was named  (DVG). Operating under the auspices of the Dutch pharmaceutical company, DVG itself was in charge of producing chemical drugs as well as operating a pharmaceutical research center. In 1964, during the Guided Democracy era, DVG was nationalized and became the Pharmacy Inspectorate of the Indonesian Ministry of Health. Three years later, it was renamed the Inspectorate of Pharmaceutical Affairs. In 1976, it was again renamed the Directorate General Drug and Food Control (Ditjen POM).

In accordance with Presidential Decree No. 166/2000, the Directorate-General of Drug and Food Control was officially divested from the Ministry of Health to become an independent agency which reports directly to the president, though it continues to coordinate with the Ministry. Since 2017, BPOM has been regulated by Presidential Decree No. 80/2017.

In 2020, the head of BPOM issued a decree regarding the standardization of English-language nomenclature used in reference to BPOM, which now includes an official translation of the agency name in English. The agency was previously known in English as the National Agency for Drug and Food Control.

Task and function

Task
As stipulated in article 2 of Presidential Decree No. 80/2017, BPOM was tasked to execute government role in the field of drug and food control.

Function
According to article 3 of Presidential Decree No. 80/2017, BPOM has the following functions:
 Drafting and executing national policy in drug and food control;
 Drafting and establish norms, standard, procedure, and criterion in supervision on before and after obtaining marketing authorisation;
 Executing supervision before and after obtaining marketing authorisation;
 Coordinating drug and food control within the central and regional governments;
 Providing technical assistance and supervision in drug and food control;
 Enforcing the law in regards to the field of drug and food control;
 Coordinating execution, supervision and administrative support for all entity within BPOM;
 Managing state assets within BPOM;
 Overseeing task and functions execution within BPOM.

Organization
Based on article 5 of Presidential Decree No. 80/2017, BPOM is organized into the following:
 Head of Indonesian Food and Drug Authority
 Secretariat General
 Deputy for Drug Control, Narcotics, Psychotropics, Precursors and Addictive Substances Supervision 
 Directorate of Pharmaceutical, Narcotics, Precursors and Addictive Substances Standardization
 Directorate of Pharmaceutical Registration
 Directorate of Pharmaceutical, Narcotics, Psychotropics, and Precursors Production Supervision
 Directorate of Pharmaceutical, Narcotics, Psychotropics, and Precursors Distribution Supervision
 Directorate of Pharmaceutical, Narcotics, Psychotropics, Precursors, and Addictive Substances Safety, Quality, and Export-Import Supervision
 Deputy for Traditional Medicines, Health Supplements, and Cosmetics Supervision 
 Directorate of Traditional Medicines, Health Supplements, and Cosmetics Standardization
 Directorate of Traditional Medicines, Health Supplements, and Cosmetics Registration
 Directorate of Traditional Medicines and Health Supplements Supervision
 Directorate of Cosmetics Supervision
 Directorate of Public and Business Empowerment in Traditional Medicines, Health Supplements, and Cosmetics
 Deputy for Processed Food Supervision 
 Directorate of Processed Food Standardization
 Directorate of Processed Food Registration
 Directorate of Processed Food Supervision 
 Directorate of Processed Food Distribution Supervision 
 Directorate of Public and Business Empowerment in Processed Food
 Deputy for Law Enforcement
 Directorate of Prevention
 Directorate of Food and Drug Intelligence
 Directorate of Food and Drug Cyber
 Directorate of Food and Drug Investigation
 Inspectorate General

BPOM has four centers, those are:
 Center of Drug and Food Data and Information 
 Center of Drug and Food Human Resource Development
 Center of National Drug and Food Testing Development
 Center of Food and Drug Research and Studies

BPOM has several Technical Implementation Units (TIUs) which spread across Indonesia. TIUs in NAFDC are Bureau and Office.

References

External links

 National Agency for Drug and Food Control of Indonesia 

Government agencies of Indonesia
Government agencies established in 1936
1936 establishments in the Dutch East Indies